The Williston Negotiation Competition is an annual negotiation and contract drafting competition at Harvard Law School for the 1L class.

Students work in paired teams of two, with each team representing a side in a complex business deal. At the end of the competition, each pair of teams submits a single contract, and each side submits a private memo to its client explaining why the client should accept the agreement.

The competition is judged by experienced negotiators from private practice and the Harvard Program on Negotiation. Teams are evaluated on three basic factors: value creation, value claiming, and contract drafting. Prizes are awarded to the team pairing that produces the best overall agreement as well as the two teams that best represent the interests of their respective sides in the negotiation.

Now in its 61st year, the competition honors Samuel Williston, professor at Harvard Law School from 1895 to 1938 and author of a classic treatise on contracts.

Winners

2014
Best overall contract: Ilan Stein, David Victorson, Albert Chen and Petra Plasilova 
Best representation of Hanford School of Law: Thomas Chapman and Jonathan Holbrook  
Best representation of Committee on Outside Activities: Andres Caicedo and Alice Nofzinger
2013
Best overall contract:Sasha Pippenger, Elizabeth Nehrling, Sarah Paige and Jennifer Garnett 
Best representation of Airlines: Natalie Rad and Tara Norris 
Best representation of Flight Attendants: Aaron Blacksberg and David Salant
2012
Best overall contract, representing Hanford School of Law: Aseem Padukone and Stella Unruh 
Best overall contract, representing Committee on Outside Activities: Andrew Sullivan and Patrick Brown
Best representation of Hanford School of Law: Nikolas Bowie and Addar Weintraub
Best representation of Committee on Outside Activities: Annie Kim and Sara Canby
2011
Best overall contract, representing Boston: Graham Phillips and Lisa Ma
Best overall contract, representing Fresh Air: Ruchi Desai and Megan Riley
Best representation of Boston: Andrew Cath Rubenstein and Doug Smith
Best representation of Fresh Air: Matthew Aldana and Benjamin Freeman
2010
Best overall contract, representing Save Our Square: Kristi Jobson and Aaron Dalnoot
Best overall contract, representing McMillin’s: Russell Herman and David Roth
Best representation of Save Our Square: Fentress Jamal Fulton and Betny Anne Townsend
Best representation of McMillin’s: Adam David Lander and Matthew Nicholas Walsh
2009
Best overall contract, representing River Red: Neil Chatani and Brian Kozlowski
Best overall contract, representing Mountain Blue: Jay Schweikert and David Carpman
Best representation of River Red: Amir Ali and Taylor Ashley
Best representation of Mountain Blue: Sarah Jelsema, Danielle Mirabal and Ian Brooks
2008
2007
Best overall contract: Mary-Hunter Morris and Sean McDonnell; and Evan Simpson and Harry Drozdowski
Best negotiators: David Kessler and Trevor Cox; and Avery Day and G. J. Ligelis
2004
Best overall contract, representing Boston: Karl Chang and Mitchell Webber
Best overall contract, representing Fresh Air Airlines: Erin Abrams and Alex Grinberg
Best representation of Boston: Stephanie Coon and Heather Ford
Best representation of Fresh Air Airlines: William Fay and Erik Zwicker
2002
First Prize and Best Negotiators, representing the airline: Patrick S. Chung and Aman F. Kapadia
1995
Best overall contract, representing McMillin’s: Andrew Kim and Clarence Mah
1989
Best overall contract, Jacqueline Fuchs and David Rockwell Jackie Fox, Doug Rappaport and Jeff Taylor
Best representation of athlete, Ellen Bublick and Dave Deakin
1982
Best Overall Contract, Frances Horner, Anita Allen, Susan McCafferty, and Jonathan Sanchez Haimen

Notable Winners
 Jonathan Zittrain
 Mary Hunter (Morris) McDonnell (Wharton Professor)
 Lloyd Blankfein
 Adrian Vermeule
 Jackie Fuchs a/k/a Jackie Fox
 Lorin Reisner (1983)
 Alan Tse (1995)

Notes

External links
 Harvard Negotiation and Mediation Clinical Program
 Harvard Program on Negotiation

Harvard University
Harvard Law School
Competitions
Legal education in the United States